Hum Ek Hain is a 1946 Indian Hindi-language film co-written and directed by P. L. Santoshi in his directorial debut. The film stars Durga Khote, along with Kamala Kotnis, Dev Anand, Rehana and Rehman in their cinematic acting debut. It was released on 8 June 1946.

Plot 
Zamindari Ma, the old landlady of a village supports its people during a famine and raises three orphaned children of differing religions. The children, although encouraged to practice their separate religions, are taught to remain united at all times. Chhote Babu, who wants to marry Vidya, the girl who is engaged to Zamindari Ma's biological son Shankar, sows discord and hatred, causing great enmity between the trio until reason prevails and they reunite.

Cast 
 Durga Khote as Zamindari Ma
 Kamla Kotnis as Vidya
 Dev Anand as Shankar
 Rehana
 Rehman as Yusuf
 Ranjitkumari as Durga
 Rane.R.V. as John
 Baby Achrekar
 Ramsing as Chhote Babu
 Gokhale
 Ganpatrao
 Manajirao
 Bhagwat
 Karadkar
 Baby Sarpotdar
 Master Sharad Kulkarni
 Master Afzul Khan
 Abdul Hamid
 Master Tazmul Hussain
 Shaikh Buranuddin
 Cuckoo as a dancer

Production 
Hum Ek Hain, which was produced under Prabhat Film Company, was the directorial debut of P. L. Santoshi, and the acting debut of Dev Anand, Kamala Kotnis, Rehana and Rehman in cinema. Santoshi also worked as writer alongside Saleh Mohammed Qureshi and Tony Lazarus. Cinematography was handled by Surendra Pai. Guru Dutt worked as an assistant director and choreographer.

Themes 
Hum Ek Hain focuses on the idea of religious harmony in India, particularly Hindu–Muslim unity.

Soundtrack 
The soundtrack was composed by the duo Husnlal Bhagatram, while all songs were written by P. L. Santoshi.

Release and reception 
Hum Ek Hain was released on 8 June 1946. Filmindia, a magazine which was then revered and feared by the Indian film industry, wrote positively about the film: "It has a theme with a purpose [...] that ought to find a response in the hearts of millions in our country." The reviewer also praised Anand's acting skills.

References

Bibliography

External links 
 

1940s Hindi-language films
1946 directorial debut films
1946 films
Films about religion
Indian black-and-white films
Prabhat Film Company films
Indian drama films
1946 drama films
Hindi-language drama films